Tibial may refer to: 
 Tibia bone
 Tibial nerve
 Anterior tibial artery
 Posterior tibial artery
 Anterior tibial vein
 Posterior tibial vein